Ye Zhaoyan (born July 1957) is a Chinese author based in Nanjing. Many of his books have been translated into English and other languages.

His paternal grandfather Ye Shengtao was one of China's most influential educators, and his mother Yao Cheng was a famous Wuxi opera actress.

Works translated into English

A Flower's Shade was the basis for Chen Kaige's 1996 film Temptress Moon, although Ye was not credited in the film.

References

1957 births
Living people
21st-century Chinese male writers
20th-century Chinese novelists
Chinese male novelists
Chinese male short story writers
Nanjing University alumni
Writers from Nanjing
20th-century Chinese male writers
People's Republic of China short story writers
Short story writers from Jiangsu